The Thompson Fields is an album by the Maria Schneider Orchestra that won the Grammy Award for Best Large Jazz Ensemble Album in 2017. Schneider was the composer, conductor, and co-producer of the autobiographical work. The title comes from the Minnesota farm where she was raised.

The Thompson Fields comes with over fifty pages of liner notes containing photographs, drawings, and Schneider's thoughts about nature.

Critical reception
In Stereo Review magazine, music critic Fred Kaplan called the album a masterpiece and ranked Schneider with big band composers Duke Ellington, Billy Strayhorn, and Gil Evans, adding that she worked as an assistant to Evans and Bob Brookmeyer early in her career. Critic Kevin Whitehead of NPR praised the album, though he said the album's grandeur could get "too purple". At All About Jazz, Dan Bilawsky called the album "awe-inspiring". He said that the quotation from Theodore Roosevelt on the liner notes fits much of Schneider's music: "'There is nothing more practical in the end than the preservation of beauty, than the preservation of anything that appeals to the higher emotions in mankind.'" In The New York Times, Nate Chinen wrote that she is borrowing methods used by Duke Ellington and Wynton Marsalis but that she has her own way of "using timbre and harmony to bring a tactile presence to the dimensions of sound." Chinen added that her orchestra planned to perform this pastoral composition at the Birdland club in New York City. Doug Ramsey at Arts Journal called The Thompson Fields a suite because of "its unity of style and its mood of reflection."

In the UK, Ivan Hewett of The Daily Telegraph comments on the importance of the liner notes, the bird paintings by Audubon, and how the music mimics the Minnesota landscape's "quality of being both huge and intimate." At The Guardian, John Fordham commented that, although The Thompson Fields is reflective, it also swings.

The Thompson Fields won best jazz album of the year in the Readers' Poll at Down Beat magazine.

Track listing

Source: Allmusic

"A Potter's Song" was dedicated to the memory of Laurie Frink, a trumpet player who had performed on all previous albums by the Maria Schneider Orchestra.

Personnel

 Dave Pietro – alto saxophone, clarinet, piccolo, flute, alto flute, bass flute
 Steve Wilson – alto saxophone, soprano saxophone, clarinet, flute, alto flute
 Rich Perry – tenor saxophone, flute
 Donny McCaslin – tenor saxophone, clarinet
 Scott Robinson – baritone saxophone, clarinet, bass clarinet
 Greg Gisbert – trumpet, flügelhorn
 Augie Haas – trumpet, flügelhorn
 Tony Kadleck – trumpet, flügelhorn
 Mike Rodriguez – trumpet, flügelhorn
 Marshall Gilkes – trombone
 Ryan Keberle – trombone
 Keith O'Quinn – trombone
 George Flynn – bass trombone, contrabass trombone
 Frank Kimbrough – piano
 Gary Versace – accordion
 Lage Lund – guitar
 Jay Anderson – bass
 Clarence Penn – drums
 Rogerio Boccato – percussion

References 

2015 albums
Big band albums
Grammy Award for Best Large Jazz Ensemble Album
Jazz albums by American artists
Maria Schneider (musician) albums